The AMD 900 chipset series is identical to the AMD 800 chipset series except for the fact that it is only found on Socket AM3+ mainboards, whereas its predecessor is only found on Socket AM3 mainboards. It was released in 2011.

This allows consumers to easily identify the Socket through the chipset name. Socket AM3+ supports solely Bulldozer (microarchitecture)-based FX-processors.

In support of AM3+ CPUs, AMD has validated the 9-Series chipset for use with HyperTransport 3.1 (up to 6.4GT/s). They also worked with NVIDIA to bring SLI support to this chipset series. AMD OverDrive is supported for simplified overclocking.

Lineup
Common features of all chipsets in the 9xx series:
 Supports AM3+ and AM3 processors
 PCI Express 2.0
 IOMMU 1.26
 SATA 6 Gbit/s with Trim support
 Up to 14 USB 2.0

990FX
 Codenamed RD990
 Four physical PCIe 2.0 ×16 slots @ x8 electrical which can be combined to create two PCIe 2.0×16 slots @ x16 electrical, six PCIe 2.0×1 lanes in various combinations of 1x 2x or 4x slots, and an additional PCIe 2.0x4 slot that does not exist on the 990x or 970 the chipset provides a total of 42 PCIe 2.0 lanes and 4 PCIe 2.0 for A-Link Express III solely in the Northbridge
 HyperTransport 3.0 up to 2600 MHz and PCI Express 2.0
 ATI CrossFireX supporting up to four graphics cards
 19.6 Watt TDP
 Southbridge: SB950
 Enthusiast discrete multi-graphics segment

990X
 Codenamed RD980
 One physical PCIe 2.0×16 slot or two physical PCIe 2.0×16 slots @ ×8, one PCIe 2.0×4 slot and two PCIe 2.0×1 slots, the chipset provides a total of 22 PCIe 2.0 lanes and 4 PCIe 2.0 for A-Link Express III solely in the Northbridge
 HyperTransport 3.0 up to 2600 MHz and PCI Express 2.0
 Support for up to two graphics cards
 14 Watt TDP
 Southbridge: SB950

980G
(Identical to 880G)

 Codenamed RS880
 Single AMD processor configuration
 One physical PCIe 2.0 ×16 slot, one PCIe 2.0 ×4 slot and two PCIe 2.0 ×1 slots, the chipset provides a total of 22 PCIe 2.0 lanes and 4 PCIe 2.0 for A-Link Express III solely in the Northbridge
 Integrated graphics: Radeon HD 4250
 Side-port memory as local framebuffer, supporting DDR3 modules up to DDR3-1333.
 ATI PowerPlay 7.0 technology
 HyperTransport 3.0 and PCI Express 2.0
 ATI CrossFire
 Hybrid CrossFireX

AMD 970
 Codenamed RX980
 One physical PCIe 2.0 ×16 slot, one PCIe 2.0 ×4 slot and two PCIe 2.0 ×1 slots, the chipset provides a total of 22 PCIe 2.0 lanes and 4 PCIe 2.0 for A-Link Express III solely in the Northbridge
 HyperTransport 3.0 up to 4800 MT/s and PCI Express 2.0
 13.6 Watt TDP
 Southbridge: SB950/SB920

Southbridge

The SB950 is the companion southbridge that provides I/O support.  It provides the following additional capabilities:

 RAID 0, 1, 10, 5 support

Southbridge issues (SB9x0)
Linux platform:
HPET operation with MSI causes LPC DMA corruption on devices using LPC DMA (floppy, parallel port, serial port in FIR mode) because MSI requests are misinterpreted as DMA cycles by the broken LPC controller
Enabling multiple MSI vectors for the SATA controller when three or more SATA ports are used results in loss of interrupts and system hang.

See also
 Comparison of AMD Chipsets

References

External links
 AMD 9-Series Chipset

AMD chipsets